The 2010 Penza Cup was a professional tennis tournament played on Hard court. This was the fifth edition of the tournament which is part of the 2010 ATP Challenger Tour. It took place in Penza, Russia between 19 July and 24 July 2010.

ATP entrants

Seeds

 Rankings are as of July 12, 2010.

Other entrants
The following players received wildcards into the singles main draw:
  Victor Baluda
  Igor Karpov
  Ilya Kovalev
  Anton Manegin

The following players received entry from the qualifying draw:
  Aliaksandr Bury
  Denis Matsukevich
  Nikolaus Moser
  Artem Smirnov

Champions

Singles

 Mikhail Kukushkin def.  Konstantin Kravchuk, 	6–3, 6–7(3), 6–3

Doubles

 Mikhail Elgin /  Nikolaus Moser def.  Aliaksandr Bury /  Kiryl Harbatsiuk, 6–4, 6–4

References
ITF Search 

Penza Cup
Penza Cup
2010 in Russian tennis